Creste is a former commune in the Puy-de-Dôme department in Auvergne-Rhône-Alpes in central France. On 1 January 2019, it was merged into the commune Saint-Diéry.

See also
Communes of the Puy-de-Dôme department

References

Former communes of Puy-de-Dôme